The 1998–99 NBA season was the 53rd season of the National Basketball Association (NBA). Due to a lockout, the season did not start until February 5, 1999, after a new six-year Collective Bargaining Agreement was reached between the NBA and the National Basketball Players Association. All 29 teams played a shortened 50-game-per-team regular season schedule and the 16 teams who qualified for the playoffs played a full post-season schedule. That season's All-Star Game, which would have been held in Philadelphia, was also canceled. The season ended with the San Antonio Spurs winning the franchise's first NBA championship, beating the New York Knicks 4 games to 1 in the 1999 NBA Finals. This was the 50th season since the BAA and NBL had merged into the NBA.

Lockout

The third lockout in the history of the NBA lasted from July 1, 1998, to January 20, 1999. NBA owners were seeking changes to the league's salary cap system and a ceiling on individual player salaries. The National Basketball Players Association opposed the owners' plans and wanted raises for players who earned the league's minimum salary.

As the labor dispute continued into September, the preseason was shortened to just two games instead of the normal eight, and training camps were postponed indefinitely. By October, it became the first time in NBA history that games were canceled due to a labor dispute. Further games were canceled by November and December, including the league's Christmas games (which had been played on an annual basis since 1947) and All-Star Game, which had been scheduled to be played on February 14, 1999. The preseason consisted of 2 exhibition games.

An agreement between the owners and players was eventually reached on January 18, 1999. When play resumed, the regular season was shortened to 50 games per team, as opposed to the normal 82. To preserve games between teams in the same conference, much of the time missed was made up for by skipping well over half of the games played between teams in the opposite conference. As a result, some teams did not meet each other at all during the course of the shortened season.

Notable occurrences

Michael Jordan announced his retirement for the second time on January 13, 1999, while the lockout was still ongoing. He would later return to play two more seasons for the Washington Wizards from 2001–2003.
The New York Knicks became only the second #8 seed to advance in the playoffs by defeating a #1 seed. As of 2020, they remain the only #8 seed to have advanced to the NBA Finals.
The Los Angeles Lakers played their final season at the Great Western Forum. Because the Great Western Bank ceased to exist two seasons prior, the arena name was replaced by the team name on center court, in anticipation of the move to the Staples Center.
The Los Angeles Clippers played their final season at the Los Angeles Sports Arena; they too would move to the Staples Center the following season.
The Indiana Pacers played their final season at the Market Square Arena.
The Denver Nuggets played their final season at the McNichols Sports Arena.
The Miami Heat played their final season at the Miami Arena, although they still played the first two months of the following season at this arena before moving to the American Airlines Arena in January 2000.
The Toronto Raptors played their first game in Air Canada Centre on February 21.
The San Antonio Spurs became the first former ABA team to win a championship. (As of February 2021, they are still the only ABA franchise with a title; the Nets and Pacers have not won a title, and the Nuggets have never played an NBA Finals game.)
The Atlanta Hawks played another season in the Georgia Dome while Philips Arena was constructed for the 1999–2000 season. This season would be the Hawks' last playoff appearance until the 2007–08 season.
 The Clippers tied the 1988–89 Miami Heat for the longest losing streak to start the season (17) from February 5 until March 11 when they defeated the Sacramento Kings. In December 2009, this record was broken by the New Jersey Nets who lost the first eighteen games of the season.
 Detroit Pistons guard Joe Dumars retired after fourteen years in the NBA, all of which he spent playing with the Pistons. 
Hall of Fame coach Red Holzman died on November 13, 1998, at age 78.
For the first time in 15 seasons, the Chicago Bulls missed the playoffs. They would also become the second defending champion in NBA history that failed to make the playoffs, joining the 1969–70 Boston Celtics.
 Karl Malone of the Utah Jazz wins his second MVP award in three years and became the oldest MVP award in NBA history as of today.

1998–99 NBA changes
 The Indiana Pacers added new gold pinstripe alternate uniforms with dark navy blue side panels to their jerseys and shorts.
 The Minnesota Timberwolves added new black alternate uniforms.
 The New Jersey Nets added new gray alternate uniforms with dark navy blue side panels to their jerseys and shorts.
 The Orlando Magic changed their uniforms, replacing the pinstripes with slightly visible stars on their jerseys.
 The Sacramento Kings added new purple alternate uniforms with black side panels to their shorts.
 The Toronto Raptors moved into Air Canada Centre during the regular season.
 The Utah Jazz added new black alternate uniforms with brown side panels to their jerseys and shorts.

Final standings

By division

Eastern Conference

Western Conference

By conference

Notes
z – Clinched home court advantage for the entire playoffs
c – Clinched home court advantage for the conference playoffs
y – Clinched division title
x – Clinched playoff spot

Playoffs
Teams in bold advanced to the next round. The numbers to the left of each team indicate the team's seeding in its conference, and the numbers to the right indicate the number of games the team won in that round. The division champions are marked by an asterisk. Home court advantage does not necessarily belong to the higher-seeded team, but instead the team with the better regular season record; teams enjoying the home advantage are shown in italics.

Statistics leaders

NBA awards
Most Valuable Player: Karl Malone, Utah Jazz
Rookie of the Year: Vince Carter, Toronto Raptors
Defensive Player of the Year: Alonzo Mourning, Miami Heat
Sixth Man of the Year: Darrell Armstrong, Orlando Magic
Most Improved Player: Darrell Armstrong, Orlando Magic
Coach of the Year: Mike Dunleavy, Portland Trail Blazers
Executive of the Year: Geoff Petrie, Sacramento Kings
Sportsmanship Award: Hersey Hawkins, Seattle SuperSonics

All-NBA First Team:
F – Tim Duncan, San Antonio Spurs
F – Karl Malone, Utah Jazz
C – Alonzo Mourning, Miami Heat
G – Allen Iverson, Philadelphia 76ers
G – Jason Kidd, Phoenix Suns

All-NBA Second Team:
F – Chris Webber, Sacramento Kings
F – Grant Hill, Detroit Pistons
C – Shaquille O'Neal, Los Angeles Lakers
G – Gary Payton, Seattle SuperSonics
G – Tim Hardaway, Miami Heat

All-NBA Third Team:
F – Kevin Garnett, Minnesota Timberwolves
F – Antonio McDyess, Denver Nuggets
C – Hakeem Olajuwon, Houston Rockets
G – Kobe Bryant, Los Angeles Lakers
G – John Stockton, Utah Jazz

NBA All-Defensive First Team:
F – Tim Duncan, San Antonio Spurs
F – Karl Malone, Utah Jazz
F – Scottie Pippen, Houston Rockets
C – Alonzo Mourning, Miami Heat
G – Gary Payton, Seattle SuperSonics
G – Jason Kidd, Phoenix Suns

NBA All-Defensive Second Team:
F – P.J. Brown, Miami Heat
F – Theo Ratliff, Philadelphia 76ers
C – Dikembe Mutombo, Atlanta Hawks
G – Eddie Jones, Los Angeles Lakers/Charlotte Hornets
G – Mookie Blaylock, Atlanta Hawks

NBA All-Rookie First Team:
Vince Carter, Toronto Raptors
Paul Pierce, Boston Celtics
Jason Williams, Sacramento Kings
Mike Bibby, Vancouver Grizzlies
Matt Harpring, Orlando Magic

All-NBA Rookie Second Team:
Antawn Jamison, Golden State Warriors
Michael Doleac, Orlando Magic
Michael Olowokandi, Los Angeles Clippers
Michael Dickerson, Houston Rockets
Cuttino Mobley, Houston Rockets

Players of the month
The following players were named the Players of the Month.

Rookies of the month
The following players were named the Rookies of the Month.

Coaches of the month
The following coaches were named Coaches of the Month.

References

1998–99 NBA season
NBA
1998–99 in Canadian basketball